Cuadrilla de Ayala    is a comarca of the province of Álava, Spain. It covers an area of 328.12  km² with a population of 34,231 people (2010). 

Comarcas of Álava